Club Deportivo San Luis Futbol Club  is a Salvadoran football club based in San Luis Talpa, La Paz.

History
The team competed in the first division in 2000/2001 season after purchasing the spot of Santa Clara. 
However the club were relegated after one season and have failed to be promoted to the first division again.

Former Coaches
Argentina
 Raúl Héctor Cocherari (-Feb 2001)

El Salvador
 Cecilio Monge
 Raúl Corcio Zavaleta
 Saúl Molina (2001)
 Ivan Ruiz
 Marco Pineda

References

External links
 Cocherari quiere hacer de "brujo" en San Luis – La Prensa Gráfica 
 Dirigencia mentalizada en salvar la categoría – La Prensa Gráfica 

Football clubs in El Salvador
Association football clubs established in 1967
1967 establishments in El Salvador